The Ismar is a right tributary of the river Câlniștea in Romania. It discharges into the Câlniștea in Naipu. It flows through the villages Radu Vodă, Dimitrie Cantemir, Izvoarele, Chiriacu and Petru Rareș.

References

Rivers of Romania
Rivers of Giurgiu County